Océane Dodin was the defending champion, but chose not to participate.

Daniela Seguel won the title, defeating Amandine Hesse in the final, 3–6, 7–6(7–5), 7–6(7–3).

Seeds

Draw

Finals

Top half

Bottom half

References
Main Draw

Barcelona Women World Winner - Singles